Friedrich Nowottny (born 16 May 1929) is a German television journalist.

Life 
Nowottny worked as director of German broadcaster WDR. He lives in Swisttal-Buschhoven near Bonn.

Awards 

1973: Goldene Kamera in category Politischer Journalist u. Kommentator
1976: Bambi Award
1980: Goldener Gong for his moderation at Bundestagswahl 1980
1982: Goldene Kamera in category Bester Politik-Moderator
1984: Orden wider den tierischen Ernst of Aachener Karnevalverein
1985: Goldener Gong for his 571th moderation of 
1986: Großes Bundesverdienstkreuz
2005: Steiger Award
2006: Deutscher Fernsehpreis Ehrenpreis der Stifter

External links 

 
 
 Dem deutschen Fernsehen fehlt einer wie Nowottny, article by Jörg Thadeusz, 15 May 2009, Die Welt
 "Nowottnys kritischer Wochenrückblick" in Nordwestradio (Podcast)
 The best Zitate

References 

20th-century German journalists
21st-century German journalists
German male journalists
German television presenters
German television reporters and correspondents
German broadcast news analysts
1929 births
Living people
People from Zabrze
People from the Province of Upper Silesia
20th-century German writers
Westdeutscher Rundfunk
20th-century German male writers
Commanders Crosses of the Order of Merit of the Federal Republic of Germany
ARD (broadcaster) people
Westdeutscher Rundfunk people
Saarländischer Rundfunk people